Counter-terrorism analysts prepared a Summary of Evidence memo for the Combatant Status Review Tribunals of the 558 captives who remained in the Guantanamo Bay detention camps, in Cuba in the fall of 2004.

The memos' release

The memos were released twice.

The 2005 release

507 of the 558 memos from the CSR Tribunals were released
in response to Freedom of Information Act (FOIA) requests from the Associated Press.
The DoD released five files.  
Four of those files have names suggesting they were released in January, February, March and April 2005.  The fifth file's name says it is the final file.  The DoD never explained why 51 of the memos were missing.

In this first release the captive's names were redacted from all but one of the memos.  Their  Internment Serial Numbers were redacted as well.  And they contained hundreds of other small redactions.  However, all of these memos contained handwritten notes, and
169 of the memos released in March had the captive's ISN handwritten back on the memos.

The memos were not in alphabetic order, they were not ordered on the ISN, or on the date when they were drafted.

The last 169 memos in the file released in March bore the captive's ISN in a hand-written notation.

The 2007 release

572 memos were released in nine pdf files on September 4, 2007.
All 558 memos prepared for the CSR Tribunals held in late 2004 and January 2005, and an additional 14 memos from CSR Tribunals held in February, March and April 2007 were included.
None of the names of ISNs were redacted.  The memos were in order by ISN.
The memos have no hand-written marginal notations.

The memos' format

The memos were all from the Recorder assigned to the captive's Tribunal to the Personal Representative assigned to the captive.  Under the rules under which the tribunals were conducted the Recorder was responsible for collating and compiling the allegations against the captive.  Under the rules under which the Tribunals were conducted the Personal Representative was supposed to learn the captive's account of himself, and present that story to the Tribunal, if the captive was unwilling or unable to attend.

The memos all contained the same four numbered paragraphs:
{| class="wikitable"
| 
Under the provisions of the Department of the Navy Memorandum, dated 29 July 2004, Implementation of Combatant Status Review Tribunal Procedures for Enemy Combatants Detained at Guantanamo Bay Naval Base Cuba, a Tribunal has been appointed to review the detainee's designation as an enemy combatant.
An enemy combatant has been defined as "an individual who was part of or supporting the Taliban or al Qaida  forces, or associated forces that are engaged in hostilities against the United States or its coalition partners.  This includes any person who committed a belligerent act or has directly supported hostilities in aid of enemy armed forces."
The United States Government has previously determined that the detainee is an enemy combatant.  This determination is based on information possessed by the United States that indicates that he was associated with Al-Qaida and the Taliban and engaged in hostilities against the United States or its coalition partners.
The detainee has the opportunity to contest his determination as an enemy combatant.  The Tribunal will endeavor to arrange for the presence of any reasonably available witnesses or evidence that the detainee desires to call or introduce to prove that he is not an enemy combatant.  The Tribunal President will determine the reasonable availability of evidence or witnesses.
|}

A list of the allegations against the captive always followed the third paragraph

The format of the allegations

The allegations were always in the form of one, or two numbered lists.

The allegations in the second list, if present, were supposed to only contain allegations of hostile activity.

The allegations in first list were supposed to established to establish an association with al Qaida, the Taliban, or other organizations with an association with terrorism.

Frequent allegations

See also
Summary of Evidence (ARB)

References

Guantanamo Bay captives legal and administrative procedures